"I Let Her Lie" is a song written by Tim Johnson, and recorded by American country music artist Daryle Singletary.  It was released in July 1995 as the second single from the album Daryle Singletary.  The song reached number 2 on the Billboard Hot Country Singles & Tracks chart, behind "Check Yes or No" by George Strait.

Critical reception
Larry Flick, a writer for Billboard magazine, reviewed the song favorably, saying that Singletary has a "stone country voice that does justice to the lyric, as pain turns to resignation."

Music video
The music video was directed by Steven T. Miller with R. Brad Murano and premiered in mid-1995.

Chart performance
"I Let Her Lie" debuted at number 66 on the U.S. Billboard Hot Country Singles & Tracks for the week of July 29, 1995.

Year-end charts

References

1995 singles
1995 songs
Daryle Singletary songs
Song recordings produced by David Malloy
Song recordings produced by James Stroud
Song recordings produced by Randy Travis
Giant Records (Warner) singles
Songs written by Tim Johnson (songwriter)